Prince of Orange was launched in Sunderland in 1814. She originally sailed as a West Indiaman but then became an East Indiaman, sailing to India under a license from the British East India Company (EIC). She made two voyages transporting convicts to Australia, the first in 1820–1821 to New South Wales, and the second in 1822 to Van Diemen's Land. Between 1830 and 1840 she made nine voyages as a whaler to Davis Strait. She was lengthened and rebuilt in 1846. In December 1852 she grounded and it took some months to get her off. She then need major repairs. She also suffered damages in 1854. She foundered in 1858.

Career
Prince of Orange first appeared in online copies of Lloyd's Register (LR) in 1815. On 29 September she put into Plymouth in distress.

In 1813 the EIC had lost its monopoly on the trade between India and Britain. British ships were then free to sail to India or the Indian Ocean under a license from the EIC. For instance, Captain Silk sailed from London on 5 April 1817 under a license from the EIC, bound for Bombay.

On 25 January 1819 Prince of Orange, Silk, master, was ashore near Ramsgate. She had been on her way to Ceylon when she ran afoul of Renewal, Cromartie, master, which was on her way to Barbados. She was gotten off but was expected to have to put into the Thames for repairs.

Convict voyage to Port Jackson (1820–1821): Captain Thomas Silk sailed from the Downs on 8 October 1820. She arrived at Port Jackson on 12 February 1821. She had embarked 136 convicts and suffered one convict death on the voyage.

Convict voyage to Hobart (1822): Captain John Moncrief sailed from England on 1 April 1822. She arrived at Hobart on 23 July 1822. She had embarked 136 convicts and suffered four convict death on the voyage.

Northern Fisheries whaler (1830–1840)
From 1830 to 1836, and 1839 to 1840 Prince of Orange was a whaler, hunting whales in the northern whale fishery, that is, the waters of Davis Strait and Greenland. The data below came primarily from Coltish:

After two years of poor whaling seasons Prince of Orange returned to trading.

Prince of Wales returned to whaling.

After two more years of poor whaling, Prince of Wales returned to trading.

On 21 February 1845 Prince of Orange sailed from Ichaboe Island. She was one of dozens of vessels that called in at the island after 1843, traffic peaking in 1845, to pick up guano. She arrived at New Orleans on 10 April and returned to Britain with a cargo of cotton.

Rebuilt 1846

On 16 January 1847 Captain Smith sailed Prince of Orange for Bombay. She arrived there on 15 May. She left Bombay on 10 July and returned to Liverpool.

On 22 October , Archibald, master, caught fire about 100 miles from Reunion while sailing from Calcutta to London. Prince of Orange, Stephens, master, rescued the crew and took them into Saint Helena.

On 4 November 1853 Prince of Orange fell on her side while in the Brunswick Graving Dock at Liverpool. She was righted but with the loss of her mizzen mast and with her fore and main masts sprung.

Fate
In 1858 Prince of Orange, was sailing from Kooria Mooria (Khuriya Muriya Islands) to Falmouth when her crew had to abandon her at sea. She foundered on 9 April near Mauritius.

Between 1855 and 1860, some 200,000 tons of guano were mined from the islands. The mining ceased soon after.

Citations and references
Citations

References
 
 
 

1814 ships
Ships built on the River Wear
Age of Sail merchant ships of England
Maritime incidents in 1819
Convict ships to New South Wales
Convict ships to Tasmania
Whaling ships
Maritime incidents in October 1850
Maritime incidents in November 1853
Maritime incidents in April 1858